The Arco Norte (lit.: Northern Arc), designated and signed as Federal Highway M40D, is a toll road in Mexico. It serves as a bypass around Greater Mexico City and currently links the Mexico-Puebla toll road on the east with the Mexico-Guadalajara toll road on the west.

The toll in 2017 for the entire  stretch of highway is 405 pesos.

Route description
The highway begins east of Mexico City at Mexican Federal Highway 150D, near San Martín Texmelucan de Labastida, which lies just inside Puebla state. The highway bends to the west, with few exits in the area. It serves few large population centers. A second phase of  opened two years later, extending the road west and south to Atlacomulco and the junction with Mexican Federal Highway 15D toward Guadalajara.

History
Construction of the Arco Norte began on February 28, 2006. The first phase opened in July 2009 (between the Autopista Mexico-Puebla and the Autopista Mexico-Querétaro). The second phase to Atlacomulco was formally opened on May 3, 2011.

Junctions

 Autopista Mexico City-Puebla

 Autopista Mexico City-Querétaro

 Mexican Federal Highway 15D/Mexican Federal Highway 57, Mexican Federal Highway 55, Mexican Federal Highway 55D, Atlacomulco

External links
 Official website

References

Highways in Greater Mexico City
Ring roads in Mexico
Transportation in the State of Mexico
Transportation in Hidalgo
Transportation in Tlaxcala
Transportation in Puebla
Mexican Federal Highways